(27 September 1961 in Nagoya) is a Japanese combat sports promoter and the president of Fighting and Entertainment Group.

Tanikawa graduated from Nihon University College of Law and worked as a journalist and executive at various sports media, most notably puroresu. After K-1 founder Kazuyoshi Ishii's resignation, Tanikawa became the president of the newly founded Fighting and Entertainment Group that was established in September 2003 to encompass K-1 as well as subsidiary mixed martial arts and puroresu promotions.

In January 2011, Tanikawa told that current conditions indicate Fighting and Entertainment Group was likely to end. On April 5, 2012, Tanikawa announced that he resigned from his position in K-1, which was mostly sold to the real estate firm Barbizon Co. Ltd. on July 28, 2011. On May 16, 2012, Tanikawa officially declared the bankruptcy of FEG.

See also
 Kazuyoshi Ishii
 Pierre Andurand
 Chatri Sityodtong
 Simon Rutz
 Eduard Irimia

References

Living people
1961 births
Japanese journalists
Nihon University alumni
K-1 executives
Mixed martial arts executives
People from Nagoya
Kickboxing promoters